Raquel Peluci Xavier Camargo da Silva (born April 30, 1978, in Rio de Janeiro) is a volleyball player who competed for Brazil at the 2000 Summer Olympics in Sydney, Australia. There she won the bronze medal with the Women's National Team. Rodrigues also claimed the gold medal at the 1999 Pan American Games.

Individual awards
 1998 FIVB World Grand Prix – "Best Server"
 2007–08 Korean V-League – "Best Server"

References
  UOL profile

1978 births
Living people
Volleyball players at the 2000 Summer Olympics
Olympic volleyball players of Brazil
Olympic bronze medalists for Brazil
Volleyball players from Rio de Janeiro (city)
Brazilian women's volleyball players
Olympic medalists in volleyball
Medalists at the 2000 Summer Olympics
Pan American Games gold medalists for Brazil
Pan American Games medalists in volleyball
Volleyball players at the 1999 Pan American Games
Medalists at the 1999 Pan American Games